Hungerford is a surname. Notable people with the surname include:

Agnes Hungerford (died 1523), Englishwoman convicted of murdering her first husband, John Cotell
Allyn Merriam Hungerford (1810–1883), American physician, Connecticut legislator, and judge
Anne Hungerford (1525–1603), English courtier and poet
Anthony Hungerford (Roundhead) (c.1614–1657), New Model Army officer
Anthony Hungerford of Black Bourton (1567–1627), MP for Marlborough and Great Bedwyn, religious controversialist
Anthony Hungerford of Down Ampney (c.1492–1558), English soldier and courtier, MP for Gloucestershire
Brett Hungerford (born 1969), Australian rules footballer
Bruce Hungerford aka Leonard Hungerford (1922–1977), Australian pianist
David Hungerford (1927–1993), American cancer researcher
Edmund Hungerford, MP for Marlborough in 1586
Edward Hungerford (disambiguation), several people
Ed V. Hungerford III, American particle physicist
George Hungerford (1637–1712), MP for Cricklade, Calne and Wiltshire
George Hungerford (born 1944), Canadian lawyer and Olympic rower
Giles Hungerford (1614–1685), English lawyer, MP for Whitchurch
Harold Hungerford (1908–1972), Australian politician in Queensland
Henry Hungerford (1611–1673), English politician, MP for Great Bedwyn, Wiltshire and Marlborough
Herbert Barker Hungerford (1885–1963), American entomologist
J. Edward Hungerford (1883–1964), American silent film screenwriter
John Hungerford (disambiguation), several people
Margaret Wolfe Hungerford (1855–1897), Irish novelist
Mary Hungerford (c.1648–1533), English noblewoman
Orison Whipple Hungerford, Jr. (1930–2017), stage name Ty Hardin, American actor
Orville Hungerford (1790–1851), American politician from New York
Ralph Hungerford (1869–1977), American politician
Robert Hungerford (disambiguation), several people
Sara Hungerford (born 1986), Australian cricketer
Thomas Hungerford (disambiguation), several people
Tom Hungerford (1915–2011), Australian writer
Walter Hungerford (disambiguation), several people
Wilson Hungerford (1884–1969), Unionist politician in Northern Ireland

See also 

 Baron Hungerford
 Baron Portal of Hungerford

English toponymic surnames